The airborne fraction is a scaling factor defined as the ratio of the annual increase in atmospheric  to the  emissions from human sources. It represents the proportion of human emitted  that remains in the atmosphere. The fraction averages about 45%, meaning that approximately half the human-emitted  is  absorbed by ocean and land surfaces. There is some evidence for a recent increase in airborne fraction, which would imply a faster increase in atmospheric  for a given rate of human fossil-fuel burning. 
Changes in carbon sinks can affect the airborne fraction. 

Observations over the past six decades show that the airborne fraction has remained relatively stable at around 45%. This indicates that the land and ocean's capacity to absorb CO2 has kept up with the rise in human CO2 emissions, despite the occurrence of notable interannual and sub-decadal variability, which is predominantly driven by the land's ability to absorb CO2.

See also 

 Greenhouse gas
 Carbon dioxide in Earth's atmosphere
 Total Carbon Column Observing Network
 Atmospheric carbon cycle

References 

Climatology